Iain Morrison is a Scottish musician and singer-songwriter. He was born on the Isle of Lewis in the Outer Hebrides.

Career 
Morrison was a member of the Glasgow-based band Crash My Model Car. They were signed to V2 Records in 2005 and released an album Ghosts & Heights.

He won Composer of the Year at The Scots Trad Music Awards in 2010. He was commissioned the same year by the Celtic Connections Festival in Glasgow, to write songs for a New Voices showcase. The show, titled Ceol Mor/Little Music, received a 5 star review  from The Scotsman newspaper.

He appeared on three programmes of the BBC TV series Transatlantic Sessions in 2011, singing three of his own songs alongside Bela Fleck, Danny Thompson and Jerry Douglas. He sang the part of Orpheus for Anaïs Mitchell's Hadestown show in Glasgow in 2011.

To record his 2012 album To the Horizon, Sir, Morrison traveled to Vermont and the home studio of producer and friend Michael Chorney. His 2015 album, Eas, was chosen as 'Album of the Year 2015' on BBC Radio Scotland's The Roddy Hart Show. Eas was nominated for the Scottish Album of the Year Award, at the SAY Awards in 2016.

In 2018, he was commissioned by An Lanntair and 14-18 Now to write new music to mark the centenary of the Iolaire. The piece is called Sàl (Saltwater). In May 2018, he released two albums, Amusement Arcade and 3 a.m.

His most recent studio album, Sàl, was released in November 2019.

In December 2020 he released a collection of previously unreleased tracks, b-sides and home recordings called "Pots and Pans".

Discography

Solo 
Empty Beer Bottles & Peat Fire Smoke (2004)
Skimming Stones... Sinking Boats (2008)
Trust the Sea to Guide Me (2010)
To the Horizon, Sir (2012)
 Eas (2015)
 Amusement Arcade (2018)
 3 A.M. (2018)
 Sàl (2019) 
 "Pots and Pans" (2020)

With poet Daibhidh Martin 
Haunted Bird (2011)

With Crash My Model Car 
Ghosts & Heights (2007)

With Poor Old Ben 
Drawing Faces to Forget (2003)

References

Reviews 
The Glasgow Herald
Folk Radio UK
The Scotsman gig review
Financial Times review
The Herald Scotland

External links
Official Iain Morrison Website

Scottish singer-songwriters
Scottish folk musicians
Scottish male guitarists
Scottish composers
Living people
Year of birth missing (living people)
Great Highland bagpipe players
British male singer-songwriters